The Corporation is a 2003 Canadian documentary film written by University of British Columbia law professor Joel Bakan and filmmaker  Harold Crooks , and directed by Mark Achbar and Jennifer Abbott. The documentary examines the modern-day corporation. Bakan wrote the book, The Corporation: The Pathological Pursuit of Profit and Power, during the filming of the documentary.

A sequel film, The New Corporation: The Unfortunately Necessary Sequel, was released in 2020.

Synopsis
The documentary shows the development of the contemporary business corporation, from a legal entity that originated as a government-chartered institution meant to affect specific public functions to the rise of the modern commercial institution entitled to most of the legal rights of a person. The documentary concentrates mostly upon corporations in North America, especially in the United States. One theme is its assessment of corporations as persons, as a result of an 1886 case in the Supreme Court of the United States in which a statement by Chief Justice Morrison Waite led to corporations as "persons" having the same rights as human beings, based on the Fourteenth Amendment to the United States Constitution.
 
Topics addressed include the Business Plot, where in 1933, General Smedley Butler exposed an alleged corporate plot against then US President Franklin D. Roosevelt; the tragedy of the commons; Dwight D. Eisenhower's warning people to beware of the rising military–industrial complex; economic externalities; suppression of an investigative news story about Bovine Growth Hormone on  Fox affiliate television station WTVT in Tampa, Florida, at the behest of Monsanto; the invention of the soft drink Fanta by The Coca-Cola Company due to the trade embargo on Nazi Germany; the alleged role of IBM in the Nazi holocaust (see IBM and the Holocaust); the Cochabamba protests of 2000 brought on by the privatization of a municipal water supply in Bolivia; and in general themes of corporate social responsibility, the notion of limited liability, the corporation as a psychopath, and the debate about corporate personhood.

Through vignettes and interviews, The Corporation examines and criticizes corporate business practices. The film's assessment is affected via the diagnostic criteria in the DSM-IV; Robert D. Hare, a University of British Columbia psychology professor and a consultant to the FBI, compares the profile of the contemporary profitable business corporation to that of a clinically diagnosed psychopath (however, Hare has objected to the manner in which his views are portrayed in the film; see "Critical reception" below).  The Corporation attempts to compare the way corporations are systematically compelled to behave with what it claims are the DSM-IVs symptoms of psychopathy, e.g., the callous disregard for the feelings of other people, the incapacity to maintain human relationships, the reckless disregard for the safety of others, the deceitfulness (continual lying to deceive for profit), the incapacity to experience guilt, and the failure to conform to social norms and respect the law.

Interviews
The film features interviews with prominent corporate critics such as Noam Chomsky, Charles Kernaghan, Naomi Klein, Michael Moore, Vandana Shiva, and Howard Zinn, as well as opinions from chief executive officers such as Ray Anderson (from Interface, Inc.), business guru Peter Drucker, Nobel laureate economist Milton Friedman, and think tanks advocating free markets such as the Fraser Institute. Interviews also feature Dr. Samuel Epstein, who was involved in a lawsuit against Monsanto for promoting the use of Posilac, (trade name for recombinant Bovine somatotropin) to induce more milk production in dairy cattle and Chris Barrett who, as a spokesperson for First USA, was the first corporately sponsored college student in America.

Joel Bakan, the author of the award-winning book The Corporation: The Pathological Pursuit of Profit and Power, writes:

Release

Box office
The Corporation grossed around $3.5 million in North American box office receipts and had a worldwide gross of over $4.8 million, making it the second top-grossing film for its US distributor, Zeitgeist Films. It took the place of Manufacturing Consent: Noam Chomsky and the Media as the top-grossing feature documentary ever to come out of Canada.

Versions

TVO version
The extended edition made for TVOntario (TVO) separates the documentary into three one-hour episodes:
"Pathology of Commerce": About the pathological self-interest of the modern corporation.
"Planet Inc.": About the scope of commerce and the sophisticated, even covert, techniques marketers use to get their brands into our homes.
"Reckoning": About how corporations cut deals with any style of government - from Nazi Germany to despotic states today - that allow or even encourage sweatshops, as long as sales go up.

DVD version
In 2005, the film was released on DVD as a two-disc set that includes following:

 Disc 1: the film, two tracks of directors' and writer's commentary, 27 minutes of "Q's & A's" with the filmmakers, 17 minutes of deleted scenes (not including a hidden clip of the "Milton Friedman Choir" singing "An Ode To Privatization"), 39 minutes of Janeane Garofalo interviewing Joel Bakan on Air America Radio's The Majority Report, 7 minutes of Katherine Dodds on grassroots marketing, theatrical trailer, subtitles in three languages (English, French, Spanish), and descriptive audio.
 Disc 2: 165 unused interview clips and updates sorted by both interviewee ("Hear More From...") and topic ("Topical Paradise"). "Related Film Resources", which is one of the topics in "Topical Paradise", includes trailers for 14 other documentary films and a three-minute UK animated film.

In 2012, a new Canadian educational version was released for high school students. This "Occupy Your Future" version is exclusively distributed by Hello Cool World, who were behind the branding and grassroots outreach of the original film in four countries. This version is shorter and breaks the film into three parts. The extras include interviews with Joel Bakan on the Occupy movement,  Katherine Dodds on social branding, and two short films from Annie Leonard's Story of Stuff Project.

Reception

Critical reception
Film critics gave the film generally favorable reviews. The review aggregator Rotten Tomatoes reported that 90% of critics gave the film positive reviews, based on 111 reviews with an average rating of 7.4/10. The website's critical consensus reads, "The Corporation is a satisfyingly dense, thought-provoking rebuttal to some of capitalism's central arguments." Metacritic reported the film had an average score of 73 out of 100, based on 28 reviews.

In Variety (October 1, 2003), Dennis Harvey praised the film's "surprisingly cogent, entertaining, even rabble-rousing indictment of perhaps the most influential institutional model for our era" and its avoidance of "a sense of excessively partisan rhetoric" by deploying a wide range of interviewees and "a bold organizational scheme that lets focus jump around in interconnective, humorous, hit-and-run fashion."

In the Chicago Sun-Times (July 16, 2004), Roger Ebert described the film as "an impassioned polemic, filled with information sure to break up any dinner-table conversation," but felt that "at 145 minutes, it overstays its welcome. The wise documentarian should treat film stock as a non-renewable commodity."

The Economist review, while calling the film "a surprisingly rational coherent attack on capitalism's most important institution" and "a thought-provoking account of the firm", calls it incomplete. It suggests that the idea for an organization as a psychopathic entity originated with Max Weber, in regards to government bureaucracy. The reviewer remarks that the film weighs heavily in favor of public ownership as a solution to the evils depicted, while failing to acknowledge the magnitude of evils committed by governments in the name of public ownership, such as those of the Communist Party in the former Soviet Union.

An interview clip with psychiatrist Robert D. Hare appears for several minutes in The Corporation. A pioneer in psychopathy research whose Hare Psychopathy Checklist is used in part to "diagnose" purportedly psychopathic behavior of corporations in the documentary, Hare has since objected to the manner in which his work was presented in the film and the use of his work to bolster what he describes as the film's questionable thesis and conclusions. In Snakes in Suits: When Psychopaths Go to Work (2007; co-written with Paul Babiak), Hare writes that despite claims by the filmmakers to him during production that they were using psychopathy metaphorically to describe "the most egregious" corporate misbehavior, the finished documentary obviously intends to imply that corporations in general or by definition are psychopathic, a claim that Hare emphatically rejects:

However, in his monologue in The Corporation and the transcript with added comments, Hare, in addition to pointing out differences between corporations, clearly uses generalized terms such as "tend", "most", "almost", "routinely", "much the same", "almost by their very nature", and "by definition" with regard to numerous of his characterizations of psychopathy applying to corporations. Nonetheless, Hare insists that his guarded, qualified comments on the "academic exercise" of diagnosing certain corporations as psychopathic was used in support of a larger thesis that he was not informed in advance about and with which he did not agree.

Awards
The film won or was nominated for over 26 international awards  including winning the World Cinema Audience Award: Documentary at the Sundance Film Festival in 2004, a Special Jury Award at the International Documentary Film Festival Amsterdam (IDFA) in 2003 and a Genie Award - Documentary in 2005.

See also 
 Corporatocracy
 Empire (Hardt and Negri book) (2000) 
 Evil corporation
 Manufacturing Consent (film) (1992), co-directed by Mark Achbar
 Manufacturing Consent (1988), the book upon which the eponymous film was based
 Psychopathy in the workplace

Notes

References

External links

 
 
 
 The Corporation at Metacritic
 
 
 
 
 
  with link to the full film in Comments

Downloads
 
 

2003 films
2003 documentary films
2004 books
Anti-corporate activism
Anti-modernist films
Canadian documentary films
Canadian non-fiction books
Documentary films about business
Documentary films about economics
Documentary films about environmental issues
Documentary films about globalization
Documentary films about politics
English-language Canadian films
Best Documentary Film Genie and Canadian Screen Award winners
Sundance Film Festival award winners
Films directed by Jennifer Abbott
2000s English-language films
2000s Canadian films
English-language documentary films